Sir Ernest Gardner  (18 May 1846 – 7 August 1925) was a British politician. He was a Conservative Party Member of Parliament (MP) from 1901 to 1922.

Gardner was born in East London, the son of Joseph Goodwin Gardner and his wife, Elizabeth. He was first elected to Parliament on 12 July 1901 in an unopposed by-election in the constituency of Wokingham following the resignation of Oliver Young. He remained the seat's MP until it was abolished for the 1918 general election, when he became the MP for Windsor. He retired from Parliament at the 1922 general election. He lived at 'Spencers' at Maidenhead in Berkshire.

Gardner had three daughters with his second wife, Amy Inglis, including the cardiologist Dame Frances Gardner.

References

External links 

1846 births
1925 deaths
Conservative Party (UK) MPs for English constituencies
English justices of the peace
UK MPs 1900–1906
UK MPs 1906–1910
UK MPs 1910
UK MPs 1910–1918
UK MPs 1918–1922
People from Maidenhead
Knights Bachelor